1760 Sandra, provisional designation , is a carbonaceous asteroid from the outer regions of the asteroid belt, approximately 35 kilometers in diameter. It was discovered on 10 April 1950, by South African astronomer Ernest Johnson at Union Observatory in Johannesburg, and named after his granddaughter Sandra.

Orbit and classification 

Sandra is a carbonaceous C-type asteroid that orbits the Sun in the outer main-belt at a distance of 2.7–3.6 AU once every 5 years and 7 months (2,041 days). Its orbit has an eccentricity of 0.13 and an inclination of 8° with respect to the ecliptic.

Lightcurve 

In April 2006, a rotational lightcurve of Sandra was obtained from photometric observations by French amateur astronomer Pierre Antonini. Lightcurve analysis gave a well-defined rotation period of 6.5668 hours with a brightness variation of 0.42 magnitude.

Diameter and albedo 
According to the surveys carried out by the Infrared Astronomical Satellite IRAS, the Japanese Akari satellite, and NASA's Wide-field Infrared Survey Explorer with its subsequent NEOWISE mission, Sandra measures between 33.989 and 37.71 kilometers in diameter and its surface has an albedo between 0.034 and 0.054. The Collaborative Asteroid Lightcurve Link derives an albedo of 0.0542 and a diameter of 36.03 kilometers with on an absolute magnitude of 11.0.

Naming 

This minor planet was named by the South African discover Ernest Johnson after his granddaughter Sandra. The official  was published by the Minor Planet Center on 20 February 1976.

References

External links 
 Asteroid Lightcurve Database (LCDB), query form (info )
 Dictionary of Minor Planet Names, Google books
 Asteroids and comets rotation curves, CdR – Observatoire de Genève, Raoul Behrend
 Discovery Circumstances: Numbered Minor Planets (1)-(5000) – Minor Planet Center
 
 

001760
Discoveries by Ernest Leonard Johnson
Named minor planets
19500410